Francis Curteis (26 June 1856 – 1 May 1928) was an English cricketer. He played six matches for Gloucestershire in 1884.

References

1856 births
1928 deaths
English cricketers
Gloucestershire cricketers
Sportspeople from Bideford